Cryptoprocta is a genus of carnivoran endemic to Madagascar. It contains the living fossa and its larger, recently extinct relative, the giant fossa. The fossas are the largest of Madagascar's mammalian carnivores.

References

Mammal genera
Mammal genera with one living species
Euplerids
Taxa named by Edward Turner Bennett